Olson was a racing car constructor. Olson cars competed in one round of the FIA World Championship - the 1950 Indianapolis 500.

Complete World Championship results

References

Formula One constructors (Indianapolis only)
American racecar constructors